Iorwerth Jones (3 April 1903 – 31 August 1983) was a Welsh rugby union, and professional rugby league footballer who played in the 1920s. He played representative level rugby union (RU) for Wales, and at club level for Llanelli RFC, as a number eight, and club level rugby league (RL) for Leeds.

Background
Jones was born in Loughor, Wales, and he died aged 80 in Penclawdd, Wales.

International honours
Iorwerth Jones won caps for Wales (RU) while at Llanelli RFC in 1927 against Australia, and in 1928 against England, Scotland, Ireland, and France.

References

External links
Search for "Jones" at rugbyleagueproject.org

Statistics at scrum.com
Statistics at wru.co.uk

1903 births
1983 deaths
Footballers who switched code
Leeds Rhinos players
Llanelli RFC players
Rugby league players from Swansea
Rugby union number eights
Rugby union players from Loughor
Wales international rugby union players
Welsh rugby league players
Welsh rugby union players